Mark Knowles and Daniel Nestor were the defending champions but lost in the quarterfinals to Wayne Black and Kevin Ullyett.

Mahesh Bhupathi and Max Mirnyi won in the final 6–2, 2–6, 6–3 against Black and Ullyett.

Seeds
Champion seeds are indicated in bold text while text in italics indicates the round in which those seeds were eliminated.

  Bob Bryan /  Mike Bryan (first round)
  Mahesh Bhupathi /  Max Mirnyi (champions)
  Jonas Björkman /  Todd Woodbridge (quarterfinals)
  Mark Knowles /  Daniel Nestor (quarterfinals)

Draw

External links
 2003 Mutua Madrileña Masters Madrid Doubles Draw

Doubles